Brian Worley (born September 8, 1972) is an American reality television host, event planner, and wedding designer. Worley is the owner of B. Worley Productions in Atlanta, GA where he has produced numerous events within the hospitality and entertainment industries.

Early life
Worley was born in Baton Rouge, Louisiana before he moved to Denver, Colorado at age 2 and Austin, Texas at age 12, where he and his younger sister were raised.

While in high school, Worley worked as camp counselor for Lost Creek Country Club. By spring of 1992, Worley had gained work experience from 3 different jobs including a sales associate position with The Gap, a tour guide position with Disney World’s Great Movie Ride, where he also played the role of Sleeping Beauty's Prince Phillip and Disney’s character Goofy.

Worley graduated cum laude from the University of North Texas with a degree in Radio, Television, and Film.

Career

Worley launched his first business in fashion with B Worley Designs, a clothing design company that expanded its business to stores throughout Texas. Although thriving as a new clothing company at the time, he pursued his true passion in wedding and event planning.

Worley began his career working with “Entertainment Tonight,” MTV, numerous award shows, and high-profile personalities. Worley was soon donned the “event guru” and budget specialist, known to turn any ordinary event into an extraordinary event.

Worley’s background in event production and design has led him to creating events such as the recent polo match featuring Prince William and Kate Middleton during their visit in the United States on July 8.
 

Other events Brian has worked on include:
 "My Little Pony: The Royal Wedding"
 premiere party for FOX’s new show “Alcatraz"
 "Operation Shower" (a charity that provides baby showers for army wives)
 Lounge and gifting suite for the Sundance Film Festival
 CW’s “Shedding for the Wedding,” 
 E!’s Party Monsters Cabo
 “Oscar Pre-Show,”
 WE TV’s “Platinum Weddings,” 
 The Style Channel’s “Big Party Plan Off,”
 Lifetime’s, “Get Married,”
 TLC’s “Battle of the Wedding Designer,”
 BET’s The Family Crews.
 Grammy After Party
 Costume Designers Guild Awards
 Days of Our Lives Anniversary Party
 Boys and Girls Club Annual Gala
 Food Network's "Wedding Impossible"

Brian has been featured on the following shows and publications:
 CW's San Diego 6 News
 Fox 5 San Diego.
 KTLA
 Vegas Ink
 The Doctors
 Trailer Codes
 People Magazine
 USA Today
 Los Angeles Times

Personal interests
Worley is known for being a green and eco-friendly advocate by implementing the philosophy to “reduce, reuse, and, recycle” through organic and pesticide-free food, bio-diesel generators, rented furniture, recycled fabric, drapes, and linens, and low watt/LED lighting. In 2011, Worley applied this idea through events like the Emmy Awards with 50% recycled material used on the red carpet and conserved 20% of the energy used in lighting.

Brian Worley currently runs an ongoing blog sharing eco-friendly tips, do it yourself ideas, wedding and event planning guides, and links to his work.

References

1972 births
University of North Texas alumni
Living people
Event planners